Lee Uk-jong (born 26 October 1966) is a South Korean athlete. He competed in the men's javelin throw at the 1988 Summer Olympics.

References

1966 births
Living people
Athletes (track and field) at the 1988 Summer Olympics
South Korean male javelin throwers
Olympic athletes of South Korea
Place of birth missing (living people)